Joan Sydney Whitmore (1922 - 2002) was a South African hydrologist specialising in agriculture and water. She wrote a book about drought management on farmland, and many reports on water and agriculture, during her career as a government scientist. She had risen to the rank of Director by 1972, which was an unusual achievement for a woman at that time...

Career
Joan Whitmore worked in the South African Agroclimatological Research Unit from 1946 until 1958, when she joined the Department of Water Affairs hydrological section. She was the driving force behind the formation of the Hydrological Research Institute at Roodeplaat Dam, and was its first director from 1972 until her retirement in 1977. She became a consultant in applied climatology and hydrology and lectured at the University of Pretoria. She was involved with the 1999 International Conference on Drought Management in Pretoria. She became an active member of Soroptimist International

Works

Awards
Department of Water Affairs Women in Water Award, 2003, posthumously.

Legacy
The Joan Whitmore bursary for female students registered for postgraduate study in environmental studies at the University of Pretoria

References

External links 
 The founding of the Hydrological Research Institute: Recollections and Reflections

Academic staff of the University of Pretoria
Hydrologists
1922 births
2002 deaths